Wolfgang Amadeus Mozart's Horn Quintet, K. 407 (386c), was written in 1782 for the soloist Joseph Leutgeb. The work calls for one French horn, one violin, two violas and one cello, differing from the usual two violins with the conventional string quartet.

Structure

The work consists of three movements, Allegro, Andante, Rondo Allegro with a usual duration of around 17 minutes. The use of two viola parts is said give the work a deeper sound, which matches the range of the soloist.

History 

Written in Vienna soon after Mozart's marriage, around the same time as the composition of The Abduction from the Seraglio. This is the first item written for Mozart's friend, the cheesemonger Joseph Leutgeb. His instrument lacked valves as in the modern French horn. The finale makes virtuosic demands on the soloist. The later horn solo pieces for an ageing Leutgeb by Mozart show lesser demands on the soloist. The work was first published by Breitkopf & Härtel in 1883. As the original autograph score is lost, modern performances are based on the first edition.

Sarah Willis of the Berlin Philharmonic includes the piece on her "Trio!" album, in the form of a piano-violin-horn trio, with Cordelia Hofer and Kotowa Machida.

References

External links 
 
 
 Quintet for French Horn and Strings on YouTube, Dennis Brain, Griller String Quartet

Chamber music by Wolfgang Amadeus Mozart
1782 compositions
Compositions in E-flat major